Ludźmierz  is a village in Poland in the Lesser Poland voivodeship, in the county of Nowy Targ. Ludźmierz is the oldest village in Podhale and is located about 85 kilometres south of Kraków.

The building of the church which the village is famous for was begun in 1234 and completed by 1238. It was run by the Cistercians who were custodians of the site until 1824.

Ludźmierz is the birthplace of Kazimierz Przerwa-Tetmajer.

Marian Sanctuary
The settlement is the site of the Marian Sanctuary in Ludźmierz, which was declared a Minor Basilica May 18, 2001. On June 7, 1997, Ludźmierz hosted Pope John Paul II, where he said the rosary in the sanctuary's Rosary Garden.

References

Populated places established in the 13th century
Villages in Nowy Targ County